Adi Mešetović (born 30 April 1997) is a Bosnian swimmer. He competed in the men's 50 metre butterfly event at the 2017 World Aquatics Championships.

References

1997 births
Living people
Bosnia and Herzegovina male swimmers
Place of birth missing (living people)
Swimmers at the 2015 European Games
European Games competitors for Bosnia and Herzegovina
Swimmers at the 2018 Mediterranean Games
Male butterfly swimmers
Mediterranean Games competitors for Bosnia and Herzegovina